María del Rosario Cristina Saborio y García Granados (24 July 1833 – 12 October 1901) was a Guatemalan woman. She was the wife of President Miguel García Granados, First Lady of Guatemala during his government. She was daughter of José Ramón Saborio y Durán and María Josefa García Granados y Zavala. She died in 1901. She had nine children with the former President.

References

1833 births
1901 deaths
First ladies of Guatemala